The German Volleyball Player of the Year has been chosen annually since 1979 by the readers of the German Volleyball Magazin.

German Volleyball Player of the Year

Sources: Volleyball Magazin and German Volleyball Federation (DVV)

See also
 German Sportspersonality of the year
 German Footballer of the Year

References

  German Volleyball Federation

Awards established in 1979
A
Volleyball awards
Volleyball Player of the Year
1979 establishments in West Germany